The 2020 season was AIK's 129th in existence, their 92nd season in Allsvenskan and their 15th consecutive season in the league. The team was competing in Allsvenskan and Svenska Cupen.

Current squad

2020 squad

Current youth players with first-team experience

Players out on loan

Players in/out

In

Out

Squad statistics
Latest updated 9 March 2020

Club Friendlies

Pre-season

Results summary

2019–20 Svenska Cupen

Group stage

Group 4

Knock-out stage

2020–21 Svenska Cupen

Preliminary round

Allsvenskan

League table

Match results

June

July

August

September

October

November

December

Notes

References

AIK Fotboll seasons
AIK Fotboll